"Who You Are to Me" is a song by American contemporary Christian musician Chris Tomlin featuring American country music group Lady A. The song was released as the lead single from his thirteenth studio album, Chris Tomlin & Friends (2020), to Christian radio in the United States on July 10, 2020. Tomlin co-wrote the song with Charles Kelley, Dave Haywood, and Hillary Scott. The single was produced by Brian Kelley, Chris Tomlin, Corey Crowder, Dave Haywood, and Tyler Hubbard. 

"Who You Are to Me" peaked at No. 2 on the US Hot Christian Songs chart, and No. 30 on the Hot Country Songs chart.

Background
On June 26, 2020, Chris Tomlin released "Who You Are to Me" featuring Lady A alongside "Thank You Lord" featuring Thomas Rhett and Florida Georgia Line, as the first two promotional singles from Chris Tomlin & Friends in the lead-up to its release, slated for July 31, 2020. On July 10, 2020, "Who You Are to Me" impacted Christian radio in the United States as the lead single from the album.

Composition

Commercial performance
"Who You Are to Me" debuted at No. 35 on the US Hot Christian Songs chart dated July 11, 2020, concurrently charting at No. 5 on the Christian Digital Song Sales chart. The song peaked at No. 2 and spent a total of thirty one weeks appearing on the chart.

"Who You Are to Me" debuted at No. 21 on the US Christian Airplay chart dated July 18, 2020. The song peaked at No. 1 on the Christian Airplay, becoming Chris Tomlin's tenth No. 1 entry and Lady A's first No. 1 entry on the chart.

Music video
The lyric video of "Who You Are to Me" was published via Chris Tomlin's YouTube channel on June 26, 2020.

Personnel
Adapted from Tidal.
 Adam Ayan — mastering
 David Cook — mixing assistant
 Corey Crowder — producer
 Dave Haywood — producer
 Tyler Hubbard — producer
 Jeff Juliano — mixing
 Brian Kelley — producer
 Lady A — featured artist
 Chris Tomlin — primary artist, producer

Charts

Weekly charts

Year-end charts

Release history

References

External links
  on PraiseCharts

 

2020 singles
2020 songs
Chris Tomlin songs
Lady A songs
Songs written by Chris Tomlin
Songs written by Hillary Scott
Songs written by Charles Kelley
Songs written by Dave Haywood